Manom is a commune in the Moselle department in Grand Est in north-eastern France.

Localities of the commune: la Grange (German: Scheuern), Maison-Rouge.

International relations

Manom is twinned with:
   Lębork, Poland 
   Lauenburg, Germany
   Dudelange, Luxembourg

See also
 Communes of the Moselle department

References

External links
 

Communes of Moselle (department)